Reddington may refer to:

People
Daryll Reddington (born 1972), former New Zealand cricketer
Ian Reddington (born 1957), English actor
Helen Reddington (born late 1950s), British academic, writer, musician and singer-songwriter 
Tony Reddin (1919–2015), Irish former sportsperson born Martin Charles Reddington
Stuart Reddington (born 1978), English former professional footballer who played as a defender

Given name 
William Redington Hewlett (1913–2001), American co-founder of the Hewlett-Packard Company

Places 
Reddington, Indiana, an unincorporated town in Redding Township

See also
Redding (disambiguation)
Redding (surname)
Redington (disambiguation)
Reding (disambiguation)
Reddin
Redden (disambiguation)
Reading (disambiguation)